David G. Peterson, (born 28 October 1944) is a scholar of the New Testament. He was senior research fellow and lecturer in New Testament at Moore Theological College in Sydney and is an ordained minister of the Anglican Church of Australia. He now lectures at the college part-time.

Peterson was educated at North Sydney Boys High School, followed by a B.D. from the University of London, an M.A. from the University of Sydney, and finally a PhD from the University of Manchester. His thesis was titled "The Concept of Perfection in the 'Letter to the Hebrews'".

Peterson was between 1996 and 2007 the Principal of Oak Hill Theological College, London lecturing in Biblical Studies and Worship. During this period he also became a visiting professor at Middlesex University. He now lectures on a part-time basis at Moore Theological College in Sydney, writing new books, and leading an introductory course on preaching called Cornhill Sydney.

He is married to Lesley and they have three sons.

Selected works

Books

Articles and chapters

References

External links

1944 births
Living people
Bible commentators
Alumni of the University of London
University of Sydney alumni
Alumni of the University of Manchester

Academic staff of Moore Theological College
People educated at North Sydney Boys High School